The Platform is a 2019 Spanish social science fiction horror film directed by Galder Gaztelu-Urrutia. The film is set in a large, tower-style "Vertical Self-Management Center." Its residents, who are switched every month between its many floors, are fed via a platform which, initially filled with food at the top floor, gradually descends through the tower's levels, stopping for a fixed amount of time on each. The system inevitably leads to conflict, as the residents at the top levels get to eat as much as they can, with each level getting only the leftovers from the previous ones.

The film's cast includes Iván Massagué, Antonia San Juan, Zorion Eguileor, Emilio Buale Coka and Alexandra Masangkay. It premiered at the 2019 Toronto International Film Festival (TIFF), where it won the People's Choice Award for Midnight Madness. At TIFF, the film also secured a worldwide streaming deal with Netflix. It was released on the streaming service on 20 March 2020.

Plot
Goreng wakes in a concrete cell marked with the number 48. His cellmate, Trimagasi, explains that they are in a "Vertical Self-Management Center" aka "The Pit", a tower-style facility in which food is delivered via a platform that travels from the top-down, halting for a fixed period on each floor. People on lower levels can eat only what those above leave and are subjected to extreme heat or cold if they keep the food. People are randomly reassigned to a new level each month. Each resident is allowed to bring one item in, Goreng choosing a copy of Don Quixote, and Trimagasi a self-sharpening knife. Trimagasi reveals that when assigned to level 132, he and his former cellmate cannibalized a resident who had fallen down the shaft. One day, a bloodied woman named Miharu rides down on the platform. Trimagasi explains that she descends the pit every month searching for her child.

It is revealed that Goreng volunteered to spend six months in the facility in exchange for a diploma, while Trimagasi is serving a year-long sentence for manslaughter. Over the first month, they become friends, but on the day of the room shuffle, Goreng wakes up tied to his bed. They have been reassigned to level 171, where the platform is expected to be empty of food when it arrives. Trimagasi explains that he plans to cut strips of Goreng's flesh to sustain them both. On the eighth day, Trimagasi begins to do so but is attacked by Miharu as she comes down the platform. She frees Goreng and he kills Trimagasi. Miharu nurses Goreng and feeds him Trimagasi's flesh, but leaves soon after. On the night before the shuffle, Goreng is haunted by hallucinations of Trimagasi, who explains that they are now one and the same.

In the third month, Goreng awakes on level 33 with a woman named Imoguiri, and her dog. Goreng recognizes her as the Administration official who had interviewed him before sending him down. She says that she was unaware of the horrible conditions and volunteered to enter when diagnosed with terminal cancer. Imoguiri rations her food and attempts to convince the men on level 34 to do so but is rebuffed. Two weeks pass and Goreng's threat to defecate on the food convinces them. The two argue over their methods of persuasion. One day, Miharu arrives injured, and Goreng and Imoguiri nurse her back to health. The next morning Imoguiri is distraught to find that Miharu has killed and eaten her dog. As Miharu leaves on the platform, Goreng mentions Miharu's search for her child to Imoguiri, who despondently informs him that there are no children in the tower and Miharu registered alone. He also learns from her that there are 200 levels in total. Goreng awakens the following month on level 202 to find that Imoguiri has hanged herself. Goreng eats her flesh to survive while plagued with hallucinations of his former cellmates.

In the fifth month, Goreng is assigned to level 6. His new cellmate, Baharat, attempts unsuccessfully to escape. Estimating that there are 250 levels, Goreng convinces Baharat to ride the platform down with him and ration the food. One of the prisoners below convinces them to send a symbolic message to the Administration by leaving a single dish untouched (a panna cotta). As they descend further, they hand out portions to the prisoners, attacking those who refuse to cooperate. On the way, they encounter Miharu being attacked and try to save her, but she is killed and they are left severely injured. Goreng and Baharat continue to descend, eventually reaching level 333 where the platform stops. Goreng notices a child - Miharu's daughter - hiding under the bed. He gets off the platform with Baharat, only to have the platform continue downward, leaving them behind. Despite Baharat's reluctance, they feed the girl the untouched panna cotta.

Goreng passes out and dreams of Baharat telling him that "the girl is the message." The next day, Goreng finds Baharat dead, having bled out from his injuries. Goreng takes the child with him when the platform arrives. They descend to the bottom of the pit, where he once again hallucinates Trimagasi, who tells him that "the message requires no bearer." Goreng gets off the platform and walks away with Trimagasi, both turning to watch as the girl ascends on top of the platform.

Cast

 Iván Massagué as Goreng, named after gorèng, which means "fried" in Indonesian/Malay.
 Zorion Eguileor as Trimagasi, named after terima kasih, which stands for "thank you" in Indonesian/Malay.
 Antonia San Juan as Imoguiri, named after Imogiri, a royal Javanese cemetery in Indonesia. 
 Emilio Buale as Baharat, named after baharat, which means "spice" in Arabic used in Middle Eastern, Turkish and Greek cuisines.
 Alexandra Masangkay as Miharu, named after , which means "to guard, to watch over, to open one’s eyes wide" in Japanese.
 Eric L. Goode as Sr. Brambang, named after brambang, a Javanese word for shallot.
 Mario Pardo as Baharat's friend
 Txubio Fernández de Jáuregui as Chef

Production
The film was produced by Basque Films alongside Mr. Miyagi Films and Plataforma la película AIE, with the participation of RTVE and ETB and support from ICAA, the Basque administration and ICO. Shooting lasted for 6 weeks.

Galder Gaztelu-Urrutia says the film's key message is that "humanity will have to move towards the fair distribution of wealth", with an exploration of the importance of individual initiative in driving political change that critiques both capitalism and socialism. The film script is based on a theatre script by David Desola and Pedro Rivero, to which more action and physical elements were added to make it more suitable for a film. "Extensive" rewriting was required to convert the unproduced theater script into a film script. The director said it was a "torturous ordeal", as the writers defended their artistic vision and did not want some of the changes to be made.

The concrete prison cells were built for the production in a Red Cross facility in a port in Bilbao. The director asked for cells that looked "economical, robust, [and] impregnable", which emphasized a sense of architectural and engineering proportion. Only two tiers of concrete cells were built; the appearance of many tiers of cells extending above and below each cell (visible from the hole in the center of each cell) was added in post-production using visual effects. The director says the vertical tower of cells "represents the dehumanized coldness of the Vertical Self-Management Center".

The director states that the film's lavish "food was treated as another character in the story, one that is aesthetically antagonistic to the architecture of the prison." The luxurious displays of gourmet food were presented on "Versailles-worthy tableware" to depict "excessive, almost erotic, opulent desire" that is eventually "desecrated" once the near-empty platform reaches the abject, starving inmates on the lower levels.

The director acknowledges that the film can be difficult to watch, but he says the purpose of this approach is to generate discussion and debate by viewers about the political messages. When asked about the film's brutal violence and cannibalism, the director said the prison's "hole is a reflection of our society, [so] it couldn’t hide the violence. It had to show how we rip each other apart".

The film uses two actors who are cast against type; Iván Massagué and Antonia San Juan, who are known for their comedic roles, were chosen to lighten the film's weighty subject by adding "humour, irony, and surrealism". The film was shot chronologically, as the main actor Iván had to lose 12 kilos (26 lbs) over the six-week shoot to show his physical deterioration.

Release 
The film was released in Spain on 8 November 2019 by Festival Films. The Platform was released onto Netflix internationally (including Spain) on 20 March 2020. In July 2020, Netflix revealed the film had in-fact been watched by 56 million households over its first four weeks of release, among the most-ever for one of their original films.

Critical response
The site's critical consensus reads: "While it may feel muddled at times, The Platform is an inventive and captivating dystopian thriller." On Metacritic, the film has a weighted average score of 73 out of 100, based on 15 critics, indicating "generally favorable reviews".

Norman Wilner of Now correctly predicted that the film would win the People's Choice Award, giving it a five-N rating and writing that the film "has everything: low comedy, political allegory, left-field twists, crowd-pleasing surprises, spectacular violence, sadism, altruism, and yet more spectacular violence, all wrapped up in a high-concept horror film that moves the premise of Cube into a merciless vertical structure. It’s grotesque and compelling, like grindhouse [Luis] Buñuel. And it never blinks."

Amy Nicholson of Variety wrote that "the film’s minimalist fury feels like the plays of Samuel Beckett. Massagué and Eguileor are up to being in a zesty Waiting for Godot. And Eguileor's nasty, delightful, occasionally tender performance feels like an audition to play a Bond villain, or perhaps the Spanish resurrection of Hannibal Lecter."

The film garnered new reviews after a surge in popularity during the COVID-19 pandemic. Sam Jones in The Guardian suggested it was "the perfect parable for life in the time of the coronavirus and a visceral investigation of how a crisis can expose not only the stratification of human society but also the immutable strands of selfishness coded into our DNA."

Accolades 

|-
| align = "center" rowspan = "15" | 2020 || rowspan = "6" | 7th Feroz Awards || colspan = "2" | Best Drama Film ||  || rowspan = "6" | 
|-
| Best Director || Galder Gaztelu-Urrutia ||  
|-
| Best Screenplay || David Desola, Pedro Rivero || 
|-
| Best Supporting Actress || Antonia San Juan || 
|-
| Best Film Poster || ||  
|-
| Best Trailer || || 
|-
| rowspan = "3" | 12th Gaudí Awards || colspan = "2" | Best Non-Catalan Language Film  ||  || rowspan = "3" | 
|-
| Best Screenplay || David Desola, Pedro Rivero	 || 
|-
| Best Visual Effects || Mario Campoy, Irene Río, Iñaki Madariaga || 
|-
| 75th CEC Medals || Best New Director || Galder Gaztelu-Urrutia ||  || 
|-
| rowspan = "3" | 34th Goya Awards || Best Original Screenplay || David Desola, Pedro Rivero ||  || rowspan = "3" | 
|-
| Best New Director || Galder Gaztelu-Urrutia ||  
|-
| Best Special Effects || Mario Campoy, Iñaki Madariaga ||  
|-
| 29th Actors and Actresses Union Awards || Best Film Actress in a Secondary Role || Antonia San Juan ||  || align = "center" | 
|-
| 33rd European Film Awards || Best Visual Effects || Iñaki Madariaga ||  || 
|}

See also 

 List of Spanish films of 2019
 Stone Soup
 Allegory of the long spoons
 The Old Man and his Grandson
 The Pit and the Pendulum

References

External links
 
 

2019 films
2010s science fiction horror films
Films about cannibalism
Films about food and drink
Films about social class
Films set in prison
Spanish science fiction horror films
Spanish-language Netflix original films
Dystopian films
Fictional buildings and structures
Social science fiction films
Films shot in Bilbao
2010s Spanish-language films
2010s Spanish films